Umrao Jaan Ada is a Pakistani television series based on Mirza Hadi Ruswa's novel Umrao Jaan Ada. It is directed by Raana Sheikh and first aired on Geo Entertainment. Aamina Bano played the title role of Umrao Jaan. The supporting cast features actors Bushra Ansari, Faisal Qureshi, Imran Abbas, Humayun Saeed and Mehmood Aslam in prominent roles. Made with a heavy production budget, it is one of the expensive television series made in Pakistan. The series depicts the courtesan of Lucknow during the mid-nineteenth century. It was a pioneer portrayal of extramarital sex after Zia's era. Due to having several mujra performances as well, the series was termed as too bold at that time.

Premise
The plot revolves around a young girl from Faizabad who is sold off in a kotha of Lucknow due to revenge that has to be taken from her father. There, she becomes an expert dancer and poetess. After a painful journey of several years, she finally returns her house where her loved ones don't accept her.

Cast
 Amina Bano ... Ameeran(Umrao Jaan)
 Bushra Ansari ... Khanam Jaan
 Faisal Qureshi ... Gohar Mirza
 Imran Abbas ... Nawab Sultan
 Humayun Saeed ... Faiz Ali
 Sadia Imam ... Bismillah
 Mehmood Aslam ... Dilawar Khan
 Badar Khalil ... Bua Hussaini
 Salma Hassan ... Raam Dai
 Meera ... Dance performance
 Jia Ali ... Dance performance

Production
It was the debut serial of Imran Abbas and Fahad Mustafa.

Awards and accolades
 3rd Lux Style Awards - Best TV Actress - Bushra Ansari - Nominated
 3rd Lux Style Awards - Best TV Actor - Faisal Qureshi - Nominated

References

Geo TV original programming
Pakistani television dramas based on novels
2002 Pakistani television series debuts